Raymond Dubly (5 November 1893 – 7 September 1988) was a French international footballer who played for France national football team at the 1920 and 1924 Summer Olympics.

References

External links
 Profile at French federation official site

1893 births
1988 deaths
Sportspeople from Roubaix
French footballers
France international footballers
Olympic footballers of France
Footballers at the 1920 Summer Olympics
Footballers at the 1924 Summer Olympics
RC Roubaix players
Association football forwards
Footballers from Hauts-de-France